Filip De Pillecyn (25 March 1891 – 7 August 1962) was a Belgian writer, and a member of the Flemish movement.  He was born at Hamme, and died in Ghent.

Bibliography

Poetry

 Onder den hiel (1920) (with Jozef Simons)

Theatre

 Margaretha Van Eyck (1914)
 Dona Mirabella (1952)

Biography

 Pastor Denys (1927)
 Monseigneur Bermijn de Paulus van Ortosland (1929)
 Pater de Deken (1929)
 Renaat De Rudder (1931)

Essay

 Hugo Verriest (1926)
 Stijn Streuvels en zijn werk (1932)
 Het boek van St.-Niklaas (1935)
 Stijn Streuvels (1959)

Short stories

 De rit (1927)
 Monsieur Hawarden (1935)
 De aanwezigheid (1937)
 Schaduwen (1937)
 De boodschap (1946)
 Rochus (1951)
 Het boek van de man Job (1956)
 Elisabeth (1961)

Novels

 Pieter Fardé, de roman van een minderbroeder (1926)
 Blauwbaard (1931)
 Hans van Malmédy (1935)
 De soldaat Johan (1939)
 Jan Tervaert (1947)
 Mensen achter de dijk (1949)
 De veerman en de jonkvrouw (1950)
 Vaandrig Antoon Serjacobs (1951)
 Aanvaard het leven (1956)
 Face au mur (1979)

Essays

 Het process van den veiligheidsdienst (1920)
 Amnestie (?)
 De dief (1930, in Het Vlaamsche Kerstboek of Ons Volk Ontwaakt)
 Gedecoreerd met de ster van Bethlehem (1935)
 Heldenhude in Vlaanderen (1938)
 Het hart met zeven zwaarden (?)
 Aan Schelde en Durme, het soete land van Waas (1939)
 Twistgesprek tussen Demer en Schelde (1956) (together with Ernest Claes)
 Hugo Verriest (1959)
 Het was toen (1972)
 Kiespijn der ziel : unpublished journalism(1981)

See also
 Flemish literature

References

External links

 

1891 births
1962 deaths
People from Hamme
Flemish activists
Flemish writers